Poland competed at the 2007 World Championships in Athletics in Osaka, Japan, from 25 August – 2 September 2007.

Medalists

Results
(q – qualified, NM – no mark, SB – season best)

Men
Track and road events

Field events

Women 
Track and road events

Field events

Combined events – Heptathlon

Sources 

Nations at the 2007 World Championships in Athletics
World Championships in Athletics
Poland at the World Championships in Athletics